Burgher may refer to:

 Burgher (social class), a medieval, early modern European title of a citizen of a town, and a social class from which city officials could be drawn
 Burgess (title), a resident of a burgh in northern Britain
 Grand Burgher, a specific conferred or inherited title of medieval German origin
 Burgher (Boer republics), an enfranchised citizen of the South African Republic or the Orange Free State
 Burgher (Church history), a member of the First Secession Church who subscribed to the Burgher Oath
 Burgher people, an ethnic group that formed during the colonization of Sri Lanka

People with the surname
 Michelle Burgher (born 1977), Jamaican track and field athlete

See also 
 Anti-Burgher, a splinter faction in the history First Secession of the Presbyterian church of Scotland
 Bourgeoisie
 Burger (disambiguation)